Luzonoparmena habei is a species of beetle in the family Cerambycidae. It was described by M. Sato and N. Ohbayashi in 1979.

References

Parmenini
Beetles described in 1979